Afudu may refer to:
Furu language, as cited in Koelle 1854
An unidentified Yukubenic language 
A dialect of Tangale